Provost Skene's House is a house in Aberdeen, built in 1545 and now housing a museum. It is named after Provost Skene, who bought it in 1669 and is thought to have commissioned its 17th century plaster ceilings.

It lies in central Aberdeen, midway between the Kirk of St Nicholas and Marischal College.

History
The building was remodelled in the mid-18th century (increasing window sizes) but remains a rare survival of Aberdeen's medieval burgh architecture, with substantially intact envelope and interior. In an attic gallery a Renaissance painted ceiling, including strapwork decoration and religious scenes, was commissioned by a member of the Lumsden family.

The building was opened to the public in 1953 as a 'Period House and Museum of Local History' by Her Majesty, Queen Elizabeth the Queen Mother. In that iteration, the rooms were furnished in the styles of the 17th, 18th and early 19th centuries. There were also displays of coins and local history. The Costume Gallery also housed regularly changing displays of period dress. 

In 2021, Provost Skene's House was reopened to the public after renovations were completed. It now houses displays on singers, writers, doctors, business owners and other prominent figures who were born, lived or worked in Aberdeen, meaning the city now lacks a general chronologically-based local history museum. The Painted Gallery is the only part of the earlier display to be retained. Rated a three star museum by the Scottish Tourist Board, the museum is free to the public.

References

External links
Provost Skene's House – official site at Aberdeen Art Gallery & Museums
Pictures and history of the house.
History of the house.
24 Hour Museum article.
Aberdeen City Council website.

Houses completed in 1545
Renaissance architecture in Scotland
Category A listed buildings in Aberdeen
Museums in Aberdeen
Houses in Aberdeen